Outmatched (stylized as outmatched) is an American multi-camera television sitcom created by Lon Zimmet for the Fox Broadcasting Company. It premiered as a Thursday night entry in the 2019–20 television season starting on January 23, 2020, and is the only live-action situation comedy series that Fox ordered for the aforementioned season. In May 2020, Fox canceled the series after one season.

Premise
The series follows a blue-collar couple in Atlantic City trying to get by and raise four kids—three of whom are certified geniuses.

Cast

Main

 Jason Biggs as Mike Bennett, Kay's husband and a blue-collar home contractor.
 Maggie Lawson as Kay Bennett, Mike's wife and a pit boss at a local casino.
 Tisha Campbell as Rita, a blackjack dealer and Kay's best friend.
 Ashley Boettcher as Nicole Bennett, Mike and Kay's older gifted 15 year old daughter. Nicole has a high language proficiency, speaking at least 5 fluently, as well as a having a strong computer science knowledge. Of the three geniuses, Nicole is the most socially aware. 
 Connor Kalopsis as Brian Bennett, Mike and Kay's eldest gifted 16 year old son. Brian is the most socially awkward of the genius trio and has a high proficiency in the sciences. 
 Jack Stanton as Marc Bennett, Mike and Kay's younger gifted 10 year old son who has only just been certified as a genius. Marc has a strong interest and gift in art and music. 
 Oakley Bull as Leila Bennett, Mike and Kay's youngest 8 year old daughter who is not gifted and is therefore considered the "normal" one.
 Finesse Mitchell as Irwin, Mike's best friend and Rita's husband.

Guest starring
 Tony Danza as Jay Bennett, Mike's father.
 Caroline Aaron as Sylvia Bennett, Mike's mother and Jay's wife.
 Alyson Hannigan as Beth, Atticus's mother with several animal-like senses.
 Eddie Kaye Thomas as Sigmund, Atticus's father who loves rollerblading.

Production

Development
On January 23, 2019, it was announced that Fox had given the production, then titled Geniuses, received a pilot order commitment. The pilot was written by Lon Zimmet who was also set to executive produce. Production companies involved with the pilot include Fox Entertainment and Disney's owned 20th Century Fox Television. The network green-lighted the series to order on May 9, 2019 and titled changed as Outmatched. A few days later, it was announced that the series would premiere as a mid-season replacement in the winter of 2019–2020. On May 19, 2020, Fox canceled the series after one season.

Casting
In February 2019, it was announced that Maggie Lawson and Jason Biggs had been cast in the pilot's leading roles. Tisha Campbell joined the cast in March. In December, Finesse Mitchell was announced to be in the main cast, first appearing in the second episode.

On January 10, 2020, it was reported Tony Danza would guest star in the series as the father of Biggs' character. On February 6, it was announced that Biggs would reunite with American Pie co-stars Alyson Hannigan and Eddie Kaye Thomas in an episode.

Release

Marketing
On May 13, 2019, Fox released the first official trailer for the series.

Episodes

Reception

Critical response
On Rotten Tomatoes, the series has an approval rating of 22% based on 9 reviews, with an average rating of 3/10. On Metacritic, it has a weighted average score of 33 out of 100 based on 4 reviews, indicating "generally unfavorable reviews".

Ratings
According to Nielsen Media Research, the series ranked 97th with an average of 3.25 million viewers for the broadcast season.

References

External links
 
 

2020 American television series debuts
2020 American television series endings
2020s American sitcoms
English-language television shows
Fox Broadcasting Company original programming
Television series about families
Television series about children
Television series by 20th Century Fox Television
Television series by Fox Entertainment
Television shows set in New Jersey